Joaquín Zamacois y Soler (14 December 1894 in Santiago de Chile – 8 September 1976 in Barcelona) was a Chilean-Spanish composer, music teacher and author. He comes from a well-known family of Spanish artists.

Biography 
Joaquín Zamacois y Soler was born on 14 December 1894 in Santiago de Chile, but, being of Spanish parents, moved to Barcelona with his family. His uncle Niceto de Zamacois was a writer, his aunt Elisa Zamacois a singer, his uncle Eduardo Zamacois y Zabala a painter, his uncle Ricardo Zamacois an actor, and his cousins Miguel Zamacoïs and Eduardo Zamacois were writers.

He began his musical career under the tutelage of his father, the also music composer Joaquín Zamacois y Zabala (alias J. Casamoz), studying later at Conservatori Superior de Música del Liceu and at Escuela Municipal de Música of the same city. Then, he dedicated himself to composition. In 1914, he was named Professor at Liceu, and in 1940 at Escuela Municipal de Música, where he was the director in 1945, transforming it into a Conservatory. Zamacois is also known for his harmony treatise and various pedagogical texts, used in Spain and Latinamerican countries.

Works of musical theory, history and critique 

 Curso de formas musicales con numerosos ejemplos musicales Barcelona: Labor, 1960 (6a. ed. 1985. From 2002: Barcelona: Idea Books) (Edició Americana: Cooper City, FL EUA: Span Press, 1997)
 De la Escuela municipal de música del año 1886 al Conservatorio superior municipal de música del 1963 Barcelona: Ayuntamiento, 1963
 Ejercicios correspondientes al "Tratado de Armonía" I-II-III Barcelona: Boileau, 1958 (Ed. 2003)
 Ejercicios de contrapunto I Barcelona: Boileau, 1977
 Guión de historia de la música Alcalá: Quiroga, 1975 (Barcelona: Tenora, 1990)
 Joan B. Lanbert, Frederic Alfonso, Joaquim Zamacois LAZ. Método graduado de solfeo (5 volums) Barcelona: Boileau, cop. 1941
 Joaquim Zamacois,  Llenguatge musical: nivell elemental,  lliçons cantades (4 courses in 4 volumes) Barcelona: Conservatori Superior de Música del Liceu, 1999
 Joaquim Zamacois, Avelino Abreu, Pere Serra Llenguatge musical: nivell mitjà, lliçons cantades (4 courses in 4 volumes) Barcelona: Conservatori Superior de Música del Liceu, 1999
 Método de bandurria Santiago de Chile, 1894
 Programa-guió de l'assignatura Formes Musicals Barcelona: Conservatori del Liceu, 1938
 Realización de los ejercicios correspondientes al "Tratado de armonía"  (3 volums) Barcelona: Boileau, cop. 1958
 Joaquim Zamacois, Avelino Abreu, Pere Serra Solfeo (6 courses) Barcelona: Conservatorio del Liceo
 Primer curso 52a. edition, 1984
 Segundo curso
 Tercer curso
 Cuarto curso
 Quinto curso 17a. edition 1989
 Sexto curso
 Temas de estética y de historia de la música Barcelona: Labor 1975 (4a. edition 1990) (Barcelona: Idea Books, 2003)
 Temas de pedagogía musical Madrid: Quiroga 1973 (4a. edition 1981)
 Joaquim Zamacois, Avelino Abreu, Pere Serra Teoría: cuarto curso Barcelona: Conservatorio del Liceo
 Teoría de la música (2 volums) Barcelona: Labor, 1949 (25a. edition 1994) (Barcelona: Idea Books, 2002)
 Joaquim Zamacois, Avelino Abreu, Pere Serra Teoría perteneciente a la asignatura de solfeo Barcelona: Boileau
 Primer curso
 Segundo curso
 Tercer curso 6a. edition. Barcelona: Conservatorio del Liceo, 1950
 Cuarto curso
 Quinto curso 13. edition. Barcelona: Conservatorio del Liceo, 1989
 Sexto curso 12. edition. Barcelona: Conservatorio del Liceo, 1989
 Tratado de armonía (3 volumes) Barcelona: Labor, 1945–1948 (14a. ed. 1994) (Barcelona: Idea Books, 2002) (Edició Americana: Cooper City, FL EUA: Span Press, 1997)

Compositions

Instrumental and orchestral works
 Elegia
 Himne ibèric, symphonic poem
 La polvera, for tenor
 String Quartet in D minor (1922)
 Scherzo humorístic
 La sega (1928), symphonic painting
 Serenada d'hivern for viola and piano (1970)
 Sonata for violin and piano (1918)
 Els ulls verds (1920), symphonic poem
 Transcription of the six sonnets by Eduard Toldrà, originally written for piano and violin, to be performed by piano and flute.

Zarzuelas 
 1925. Margaritiña "Zarzuela en dos actos (el primero dividido en dos cuadros)", with lyrics by Marià Golobardas de la Torre.
 1928. El aguilón "Zarzuela en dos actos".
 1931. El caballero del mar. "Zarzuela en 2 actos en prosa y verso". Libretto by Adame Martínez and Torrado Estrada.

Songs in Catalan 
 A Montserrat, song with lyrics by E. Morant
 Amor distret, for voice and orchestra
 L'autobús (1919), couplet signed by I. Casamoz, with lyrics by Juan Misterio
 La balladora, song with lyrics by Juan Misterio
 La boletaire (1919), couplet with lyrics by Marià Golobardas
 Campanar nevat, song with lyrics by 
 Cant de joia, for choir
 Corpus, song with lyrics by Joan Maragall
 Cuca de llum (ca 1928), song with lyrics by Joan Maria Guasch
 Dorm, Jesús de Natzaret (1965), for choir
 Enviant flors, for voice and orchestra
 L'escolanet (1919), couplet with lyrics by Vicenç Andrés
 Les garbes dormen al camp, song with lyrics by Josep Maria de Sagarra
 Ha nascut el Redemptor (1965), for choir
 I és el tramvia! (1921), song signed I. Casamoz, with lyrics by Juan Misterio
 El mariner, song with lyrics by Clementina Arderiu
 Nena (1919), couplet with music by I. Casamoz, lyrics by Pedro Puche
 Non, non, nonetes, song with lyrics by Joan Casas i Vila
 Oi que si (1919), fox-trot by 'I. Casamoz and lyrics by Joaquim Montero and J.Misterio
 Per Sant Joan, for choir
 Serenata d'hivern, song with lyrics by Josep Carner
 La solfejadora: si, la, sol, fa, mi, re, do (1919), song by I. Casamoz and lyrics by Joaquim Montero and Josep Aznar
 El torrent (ca 1926), song with lyrics by 
 Els Tres Tombs de Sant Anton, lyrics by Juan Misterio
 El vailet (1926), lyrics by Joan Maria Guasch
 Ve i va (ca 1930), song with lyrics by Josep Carner

Songs in Spanish 
 With lyrics by M. Bachonta: El burlado burlador (1918),Caireles, El coronel (1918), El ruiseñor, jota
 With lyrics by Marià Golobardas de la Torre: Como la flor (ca. 1920), Dale al abanico (1919), fox-trot also with lyrics by Josep Aznar, Juguetes de amor (1919), fox-trot, ¿Soltera – Casada? (1919), Soltera, no (1919),
 With lyrics by Antonio Graciani: La galbana: canción antillana (ca. 1920), La misión de España (1919)
 With lyrics by Juan Misterio:  Ay mamá (1918), El loco Shimmy (1921), El minero (ca 1925), La Miss de London (ca. 1925)
 With lyrics by Pedro Puche: Rey y señor (ca. 1932), Tu besar (1919), couplet, ¿Volverá? (1919), couplet
 La chilenita, habanera
 Con trompetas y tambores (1963), Christmas carol for mixed choir
 Cuando se quiere de veras (ca 1922), couplet by I. Casamoz
 Djalma: rag-time, oriental fashion (1920), lyrics by Casamoz and 
 En la noche tranquila (1963), Christmas carol for mixed choir
 Esencia chula, couplet
 La inmensa jota (1917)
 ¡Pobre Dolores! (1919), song with lyrics by Joaquim Montero
 Rosa de nieve, song with lyrics by Eduardo Montesinos
 La tiple ligera (1932), music and lyrics by Zamacois
 Tu boca (ca 1931), song with lyrics by "J. Casamoz"
 El vals del jerez (1913), song with lyrics by Jerónimo Gaid
 Vergonzosa (ca 1925), couplet with lyrics by Pousinet

Piano pieces 
 Aguafuertes (1939), five-piece suite (Pórtico, Becqueriana, Sardana, Ante una invocación pagana, Capricho)
 Elena (1913), masurca dedicated to his mother
 Souvenir de jeunesse, by "J. Casamoz"

Sardanes 
 L'amic Manel (1934)
 Cant de joia (1975)
 Cap d'any (1929)
 El conte de l'avi (1946)
 Diana (1970)
 Figaronenca (1929)
 Irene (1975)
 Margaridó (1975)
 Montigalà (1975)
 Raimon (1970)
 Ricard (1970)

References

 Diccionario Biográfico de los Grandes Compositores de la Música. Marc Honegger. ESPASA CALPE. Madrid 1994.
 List of sardanes by Joaquim Zamacois (in Catalan)

1894 births
1976 deaths
Chilean composers
Chilean male composers
Spanish male composers
Spanish composers
20th-century composers
Musicians from Barcelona
20th-century Spanish musicians
People from Santiago
20th-century Spanish male musicians
Spanish people of Basque descent
Catalan-language writers
Composers from Catalonia
Chilean emigrants to Spain